Legate may refer to:
Legatus, a higher ranking general officer of the Roman army drawn from among the senatorial class 
Legatus Augusti pro praetore, a provincial governor in the Roman Imperial period
A member of a legation
A representative, such as an ambassador,  envoy, or delegate. 
Papal legate, a delegate messenger from the Holy See
Legate (Star Trek), a rank in the Cardassian military in the fictional Star Trek universe
Jiedushi, regional military governors in imperial China, sometimes translated as "legates"